Sonja Terpstra is an Australian politician. She has been a Labor Party member of the Victorian Legislative Council since 2018, representing Eastern Metropolitan Region.

Terpstra is a member of the Labor Left faction of the Labor Party.

References

Year of birth missing (living people)
Living people
Australian Labor Party members of the Parliament of Victoria
Labor Left politicians
Members of the Victorian Legislative Council
Women members of the Victorian Legislative Council
21st-century Australian politicians
21st-century Australian women politicians